</noinclude>
The Sovereign Military Order of Malta passport is a travel document issued to officials and diplomats of the Sovereign Military Order of Malta (SMOM). The order issues biometric passports which are fully ICAO9303 compliant. 

Types of passport
The Sovereign Military Order of Malta issues two types of passport.

Diplomatic passports

Diplomatic passports of the Sovereign Military Order of Malta are issued only to the members of the Sovereign Council (the government of the Order) and to representatives of the Order's diplomatic corps (heads and members of diplomatic missions abroad as well as spouses of full-time diplomats and their minor children). The validity of the passport is strictly linked to the duration of the assignment. As of February 2018 there were approximately 500 passports in circulation. The numerous other members and volunteers of the Order remain citizens of their own respective countries with their national passports.

Among those who possess an Order of Malta diplomatic passport are:

 The Grand Master (actual position vacant since April 2020; since 13 June 2022 Fra' John T. Dunlap who also has a Canadian passport holds that position as Lieutenant of the Grand Master).
 The Grand Commander (since May 2019 Fra’ Ruy Gonçalo do Valle Peixoto de Villas Boas who also has a Portuguese passport).
 The Grand Chancellor (since May 2014 Albrecht Freiherr von Boeselager who also has a German passport).

Service passports

Service passports of the Sovereign Military Order of Malta are issued only to people who are in charge of a special mission within the Sovereign Military Order of Malta. The validity of the passport is strictly linked to the duration of the assignment. Currently, ten service passports are in use.

Physical appearance
Diplomatic passports are red, whereas service passports are black. 

The country-code XOM has been assigned by the ICAO after consultation with the SMOM and the machine-readable zone thus starts with P<XOM.

Acceptance

The SMOM has diplomatic relations with 112 countries, which therefore accept the passport. In the Schengen area (where most of the extraterritorialities of the order are located) it is recognized by twenty-three (except for Denmark, France and Norway) out of 26 members.

See also
Vatican and Holy See passports

References

External links
 Press release: The Order of Malta clarifies press reported figure on passports issue: currently 500 passports in circulation
 Document: XOM-AD-02001 (PRADO)
 Document: XOM-AS-02001 (PRADO)

Sovereign Military Order of Malta
Passports
International travel documents